Fred W. Springer was a member of the Wisconsin State Assembly.

Biography
Springer was born on the Oder in the Free City of Frankfurt on January 4, 1859. He would attend the Spencerian Business College. Springer died in 1936 and is buried at Forest Home Cemetery in Milwaukee, Wisconsin.

Career
Springer was elected to the Assembly in 1928. Previously, he was a member of the Milwaukee School Commission in 1893, 1896 and 1904. He was a Republican.

References

People from the Free City of Frankfurt
Politicians from Milwaukee
Republican Party members of the Wisconsin State Assembly
Detroit Business Institute alumni
1859 births
1936 deaths